Aelurillus basseleti is a species of jumping spider in the genus Aelurillus that has been found in Algeria and Tunisia. The spider was first identified in 1846 by Hippolyte Lucas, but the original male holotype has been lost. The female was first described in 2006. The spider is small and hard to distinguish from Aelurillus luctuosus and Aelurillus monardi.

Taxonomy
The male was first identified by the French arachnologist Hippolyte Lucas in 1846 and originally allocated to the genus Salticus. In 1876, Eugène Simon moved the species to the genus Aelurops and then, in 1880, Pietro Pavesi moved it to the genus Ictidops before Simon finally moved it to Aelurillus in 1886. The female was not described until 2006.

Description
The species is similar to Aelurillus luctuosus and Aelurillus monardi, with the females being almost identical, while the males differ only in details like a white, yellow or tawny band on the clypeus. The original male holotype has been lost.

Distribution
The species has been identified in both Algeria and Tunisia, although the latter has been doubted by Galina Azarkina and Dmitri Logunov in their 2006 reassessment.

References

Citation

Bibliography

Arthropods of Egypt
Endemic fauna of Algeria
Endemic fauna of Tunisia
Salticidae
Spiders of Africa
Spiders described in 1846
Taxa named by Hippolyte Lucas